The Albanian American Civic League (AACL, Albanian: Lidhja Qytetare Shqiptaro-Amerikane) is the only Albanian American lobby group in Washington, D.C., representing the concerns and interests of the Albanian people in the United States and the Balkans. The Civic League was founded by former Congressman Joseph DioGuardi and a board of Albanian Americans in 1989. Since then, it has actively and effectively lobbied the United States Congress in an effort to influence U.S. foreign policy in the Balkans, including for the independence of Kosovo.

History
The Albanian American Civic League was founded in January 1989 by former Albanian American Congressman Joseph J. DioGuardi and a handful of Albanian American businessmen who sought to influence the policies of the United States State Department with regard to the Balkans, particularly Kosovo. Over the years, the organization has raised millions of dollars to help promote its causes. The AACL lobbied prominent U.S. senators such as Claiborne Pell, Al D'Amato, Carl Levin, William Broomfield, Larry Pressler and most notably Eliot Engel for its cause.

Notes

to be

References

External links
Official Website of Albanian American Civic League

Foreign policy political advocacy groups in the United States
Albania–United States relations
Albanian-American history
Organizations established in 1989
1989 establishments in the United States